National Secondary Route 164, or just Route 164 (or ) is a National Road Route of Costa Rica, located in the Alajuela, Guanacaste provinces.

Description
In Alajuela province the route covers Upala canton (Upala, Aguas Claras, Delicias, Canalete districts).

In Guanacaste province the route covers Bagaces canton (Bagaces, Mogote districts).

References

Highways in Costa Rica